Cayratia mollissima is an evergreen species of climber plant found in Indochina, Malaysia and the Philippines. It has 3-foliate leaves with small bluish green flowers and produces pinkish white berries, and usually grows at forest margins.

References

External links
Cayratia mollissima (Wall.) Gagnep. at Tropicos.org
Cayratia mollissima Gagnepain location information at GBIF.org
Map of Cayratia mollissima at DiscoverLife.org

mollissima
Flora of Indo-China
Flora of Peninsular Malaysia
Flora of Borneo
Flora of the Philippines